Barkot is one of the 44 union councils, administrative subdivisions, of Haripur District in Khyber-Pakhtunkhwa province of Pakistan. The town of Barkot is located at an altitude of 1379 m (4527 ft).

References 

Union councils of Haripur District